Toomorrow can refer to:

 Toomorrow (film) a 1970 film starring Olivia Newton-John
 Toomorrow (soundtrack) - the soundtrack from the film
 Toomorrow (band), the band featured in the film and soundtrack
 Toomorrow (Wagon Christ album), an album by Luke Vibert